Discourse on the Method of Rightly Conducting One's Reason and of Seeking Truth in the Sciences is a philosophical and autobiographical treatise published by René Descartes in 1637. It is best known as the source of the famous quotation "Je pense, donc je suis" ("I think, therefore I am", or "I am thinking, therefore I exist"), which occurs in Part IV of the work. A similar argument, without this precise wording, is found in Meditations on First Philosophy (1641), and a Latin version of the same statement Cogito, ergo sum is found in Principles of Philosophy (1644).

Discourse on the Method is one of the most influential works in the history of modern philosophy, and important to the development of natural sciences. In this work, Descartes tackles the problem of skepticism, which had previously been studied by other philosophers. While addressing some of his predecessors and contemporaries, Descartes modified their approach to account for a truth he found to be incontrovertible; he started his line of reasoning by doubting everything, so as to assess the world from a fresh perspective, clear of any preconceived notions.

The book was originally published in Leiden, in the Netherlands. Later, it was translated into Latin and published in 1656 in Amsterdam. The book was intended as an introduction to three works: Dioptrique, Météores and Géométrie. La Géométrie contains Descartes's initial concepts that later developed into the Cartesian coordinate system. The text was written and published in French rather than Latin, the latter being the language in which most philosophical and scientific texts were written and published at that time. Most of Descartes' other works were written in Latin.

Together with Meditations on First Philosophy, Principles of Philosophy and Rules for the Direction of the Mind, it forms the base of the epistemology known as Cartesianism.

Organization

The book is divided into six parts, described in the author's preface as:

 Various considerations touching the Sciences
 The principal rules of the Method which the Author has discovered
 Certain of the rules of Morals which he has deduced from this Method
 The reasonings by which he establishes the existence of God and of the Human Soul
 The order of the Physical questions which he has investigated, and, in particular, the explication of the motion of the heart and of some other difficulties pertaining to Medicine, as also the difference between the soul of man and that of the brutes
 What the Author believes to be required in order to greater advancement in the investigation of Nature than has yet been made, with the reasons that have induced him to write

Part I: Various scientific considerations 

Descartes begins by allowing himself some wit:

A similar observation can be found in Hobbes, when he writes about human abilities, specifically wisdom and "their own wit": "But this proveth rather that men are in that point equal, than unequal. For there is not ordinarily a greater sign of the equal distribution of anything than that every man is contented with his share," but also in Montaigne, whose formulation indicates that it was a commonplace at the time: "Tis commonly said that the justest portion Nature has given us of her favors is that of sense; for there is no one who is not contented with his share." Descartes continues with a warning:

Descartes describes his disappointment with his education: "[A]s soon as I had finished the entire course of study…I found myself involved in so many doubts and errors, that I was convinced I had advanced no farther…than the discovery at every turn of my own ignorance." He notes his special delight with mathematics, and contrasts its strong foundations to "the disquisitions of the ancient moralists [which are] towering and magnificent palaces with no better foundation than sand and mud."

Part II: Principal rules of the Method 

Descartes was in Germany, attracted thither by the wars in that country, and describes his intent by a "building metaphor" (see also: Neurath's boat). He observes that buildings, cities or nations that have been planned by a single hand are more elegant and commodious than those that have grown organically. He resolves not to build on old foundations, or to lean upon principles which, he had taken on faith in his youth. Descartes seeks to ascertain the true method by which to arrive at the knowledge of whatever lay within the compass of his powers; he presents four precepts:

Part III: Morals and Maxims of conducting the Method 

Descartes uses the analogy of rebuilding a house from secure foundations, and extends the analogy to the idea of needing a temporary abode while his own house is being rebuilt. The following three maxims were adopted by Descartes so that he could effectively function in the "real world" while experimenting with his method of radical doubt. They formed a rudimentary belief system from which to act before he developed a new system based on the truths he discovered using his method:

Part IV: Proof of God and the Soul
Applying the method to itself, Descartes challenges his own reasoning and reason itself. But Descartes believes three things are not susceptible to doubt and the three support each other to form a stable foundation for the method. He cannot doubt that something has to be there to do the doubting (I think, therefore I am). The method of doubt cannot doubt reason as it is based on reason itself. By reason there exists a God, and God is the guarantor that reason is not misguided. Descartes supplies three different proofs for the existence of God, including what is now referred to as the ontological proof of the existence of God.

Part V: Physics, the heart, and the soul of man and animals 

Here he describes how in other writings he discusses the idea of laws of nature, of the sun and stars, the idea of the moon being the cause of ebb and flow, on gravitation, and going on to discuss light and fire.

Describing his work on light, he states:

His work on such physico-mechanical laws is, however, projected into a "new world." A theoretical place God created

Descartes does this "to express my judgment regarding ... [his subjects] with greater freedom, without being necessitated to adopt or refute the opinions of the learned".

He goes on to say that he "was not, however, disposed, from these circumstances, to conclude that this world had been created in the manner I described; for it is much more likely that God made it at the first such as it was to be." Despite this admission, it seems that Descartes' project for understanding the world was that of re-creating creation—a cosmological project which aimed, through Descartes' particular brand of experimental method, to show not merely the possibility of such a system, but to suggest that this way of looking at the world—one with (as Descartes saw it) no assumptions about God or nature—provided the only basis upon which he could see knowledge progressing (as he states in Book II).

Thus, in Descartes' work, we can see some of the fundamental assumptions of modern cosmology in evidence—the project of examining the historical construction of the universe through a set of quantitative laws describing interactions which would allow the ordered present to be constructed from a chaotic past.

He goes on to the motion of the blood in the heart and arteries, endorsing the findings of "a physician of England" about the circulation of blood, referring to William Harvey and his work De motu cordis in a marginal note. But then he disagrees strongly about the function of the heart as a pump, ascribing the motive power of the circulation to heat rather than muscular contraction. He describes that these motions seem to be totally independent of what we think, and concludes that our bodies are separate from our souls.

He does not seem to distinguish between mind, spirit and soul, which are identified as our faculty for rational thinking. Hence the term "I think, therefore I am."  All three of these words (particularly "mind" and "soul") can be identified by the single French term âme.

Part VI: Prerequisites for advancing the investigation of Nature 
Descartes begins by noting, without directly referring to it, the recent trial of Galileo for heresy and the condemnation of heliocentrism; he explains that for these reasons he has been slow to publish.

Secure on these foundation stones, Descartes shows the practical application of "the Method" in Mathematics and the Science.

Influencing future science
Skepticism had previously been discussed by philosophers such as Sextus Empiricus, Al-Kindi, Al-Ghazali, Francisco Sánchez and Michel de Montaigne. Descartes started his line of reasoning by doubting everything, so as to assess the world from a fresh perspective, clear of any preconceived notions or influences.
This is summarized in the book's first precept to "never to accept anything for true which I did not clearly know to be such". This method of pro-foundational skepticism is considered to be the start of modern philosophy.

Quotations
 "The most widely shared thing in the world is good sense, for everyone thinks he is so well provided with it that even those who are the most difficult to satisfy in everything else do not usually desire to have more good sense than they have. It is not likely that everyone is mistaken in this…" (part I, AT p. 1 sq.)
 "I know how very liable we are to delusion in what relates to ourselves; and also how much the judgments of our friends are to be suspected when given in our favor." (part I, AT p. 3)
 "… I believed that I had already given sufficient time to languages, and likewise to the reading of the writings of the ancients, to their histories and fables. For to hold converse with those of other ages and to travel, are almost the same thing." (part I, AT p. 6)
 "Of philosophy I will say nothing, except that when I saw that it had been cultivated for so many ages by the most distinguished men; and that yet there is not a single matter within its sphere which is still not in dispute and nothing, therefore, which is above doubt, I did not presume to anticipate that my success would be greater in it than that of others." (part I, AT p. 8)
 "… I entirely abandoned the study of letters, and resolved no longer to seek any other science than the knowledge of myself, or of the great book of the world.…" (part I, AT p. 9)
 "The first was to include nothing in my judgments than what presented itself to my mind so clearly and distinctly that I had no occasion to doubt it." (part II, AT p. 18)
 "… In what regards manners, everyone is so full of his own wisdom, that there might be as many reformers as heads.…" (part VI, AT p. 61)
 "… And although my speculations greatly please myself, I believe that others have theirs, which perhaps please them still more." (part VI, AT p. 61)

See also
 Mathesis universalis
 Great Conversation

References

External links

 
 
  (édition Victor Cousin, Paris 1824)
 Discours de la méthode, par Adam et Tannery, Paris 1902. (academic standard edition of the original text, 1637), Pdf, 80 pages, 362 kB.
 Contains Discourse on the Method, slightly modified for easier reading
 Free audiobook at librivox.org or at audioofclassics

1637 books
Epistemology literature
Epistemology of science
Mathematics books
Philosophy books
Philosophy of science literature
Works by René Descartes